Drivel may refer to:

 Drivel, nonsense speech
 Drivel, an American term for saliva
 Driveling, the act of drooling